Ordinary Average Guy is the ninth solo studio album, and its title-track single (second on the playlist), by American singer-songwriter and multi-instrumentalist Joe Walsh. The album was released in mid 1991.  It was Walsh's first album of entirely new music since Got Any Gum? in 1987, and his first solo album to be issued internationally by Epic following a four-year alliance with Warner Bros. Records in the United States and Canada. The album features Ringo Starr, Survivor's lead vocalist Jimi Jamison, and the drummer Joe Vitale from Walsh's former band Barnstorm. Vitale also sings the lead vocals on the final track of the album, "School Days".

Reception

Writing for AllMusic, critic Vincent Jeffries wrote of the album "This collection of nostalgia, decent balladry, and quirky anthems probably reinforced any notions of Joe Walsh's creative decline... this reflective, sometimes half-hearted effort belies a weariness that's both sad and difficult to appreciate as this master goes through the motions."

Track listing
All songs by Joe Walsh, except where noted.

Personnel 
 Joe Walsh – vocals, keyboards, guitars 
 Joe Vitale – keyboards, drums, percussion, vocals, lead vocals (11)
 Waddy Wachtel – guitars (5)
 Rick Rosas – bass (1-4, 6-11), vocals 
 George "Chocolate" Perry – bass (5)
 Chad Cromwell – drums, percussion
 Otis Lawrence – saxophones
 Kelly Hurt – backing vocals
 Lavestia Miller – backing vocals 
 Al Paris – backing vocals
 Jeffrey Rogers – backing vocals

Production 
 Joe Walsh – producer 
 Joe Vitale – producer 
 Scott MacLellan – executive producer 
 Dave Reynolds – recording, mixing 
 Jim Nipar – recording (5)
 Bill Szymczyk – recording (5)
 Tim Ray – recording assistant, mix assistant 
 Jim Stabile – recording assistant
 John Walls – recording assistant, mix assistant 
 Vlado Meller – mastering 
 David Coleman – art direction 
 Alan Messer – photography 
 Patrick Cullie – barn photography 
 Willie Gibson – barn photography

Studios
 Recorded at Pyramid Recording Studio (Lookout Mountain, Tennessee) and Kiva Recording Studio (Memphis, Tennessee).
 Mixed at Kiva Recording Studio
 Mastered at Sony Music Studios (New York City, New York).

Charts
Album - Billboard (United States)

Singles - Billboard (United States)

See also
 List of albums released in 1991
 Joe Walsh discography

References

Joe Walsh albums
1991 albums
Epic Records albums
Albums produced by Joe Walsh
Albums produced by Joe Vitale (musician)